The isoazimuth is the locus of the points on the Earth's surface whose initial orthodromic course with respect to a fixed point is constant.

That is, if the initial orthodromic course Z from the starting point S to the fixed point X is 80  degrees, the associated isoazimuth is formed by all points whose initial orthodromic course with respect to point X is 80° (with respect to true north). The isoazimuth is written using the notation isoz(X, Z) .

The isoazimuth is of use when navigating with respect to an object of known location, such as a radio beacon. A straight line called the azimuth line of position is drawn on a map, and on most common map projections this is a close enough approximation to the isoazimuth. On the Littrow projection, the correspondence is exact. This line is then crossed with an astronomical observation called a Sumner line, and the result gives an estimate of the navigator's position.

Isoazimutal on the spherical Earth 
Let X be a fixed point on the Earth of coordinates latitude: , and longitude: . In a terrestrial spherical model, the equation of isoazimuth curve with initial course C passing through point S(B, L) is:

Isoazimutal of a star 
In this case the X point is the illuminating pole of the observed star, and the angle Z is its azimuth. The equation of the isoazimuthal  curve for a star with coordinates (Dec, GHA), - Declination and Greenwich hour angle -, observed under an azimuth Z is given by:
 
 
where LHA is the  local hour angle, and all points with latitude B and longitude L, they define the curve.

See also 
 Great circle
 Rhumb line
 Cartography
 Navigational algorithms

References

External links 
 Navigational Algorithms http://sites.google.com/site/navigationalalgorithms/
 Institut français de navigation https://web.archive.org/web/20140103212146/http://www.ifnavigation.org/

Cartography
Navigation
Celestial navigation